Kosel is a village in the municipality of Ohrid, North Macedonia.

The village is known for its proximity to the extinct volcano Duvalo, which gives the village and its surroundings a permanent sulphuric scent.

The population of Kosel Municipality, which merged with Ohrid Municipality in 2002, was 1,369.

Demographics
As of the 2021 census, Kosel had 566 residents with the following ethnic composition:
Macedonians 553
Persons for whom data are taken from administrative sources 9
Others 4

According to the 2002 census, the village had a total of 586 inhabitants. Ethnic groups in the village include:
Macedonians 576
Serbs 6
Others 4

Sports
Local football club FK Vulkan plays in the OFS Ohrid league.

References

Villages in Ohrid Municipality